The Saône is a river in eastern France. It is a right tributary of the Rhône, rising at Vioménil in the Vosges department and joining the Rhône in Lyon, at the southern end of the Presqu'île.

The name  derives from that of the Gallic river goddess Souconna, which has also been connected with a local Celtic tribe, the Sequanes.

Geography
Its largest tributary is the Doubs; upstream of receiving the Doubs at Verdun-sur-le-Doubs in Saône-et-Loire, the Saône is called the "Petite Saône" (lesser Saône), which reflects the large contribution of the Doubs to the Saône. Nonetheless the Saône has a substantially larger watershed than the Doubs, at  vs. .

At  the Saône has the largest watershed of any French river that does not flow directly into the sea, covering approximately 1/18 of metropolitan France.

In pre-Roman times the river's name was "Arar", a doubling of the Indo-European root ar (water). According to Caesar's Gallic Wars this doubling reflected the idea that it was difficult to identify the direction of the river due to its slow rate of flow. Its current name came from a sacred spring, Sauc-Onna, located at Chalon, which was used by Roman legionaries to refer to the entire river.

Departments and cities traversed by the Saône

 Vosges: Darney, Monthureux-sur-Saône, Châtillon-sur-Saône
 Haute-Saône: Jonvelle, Corre, Jussey, Port-sur-Saône, Scey-sur-Saône, Gray
 Côte-d'Or: Auxonne, Saint-Jean-de-Losne, Seurre
 Saône-et-Loire: Verdun-sur-le-Doubs, Chalon-sur-Saône, Tournus, Mâcon, Crêches-sur-Saône
 Rhône: Belleville-sur-Saône, Villefranche-sur-Saône, Anse, Neuville-sur-Saône, Fontaines-sur-Saône, Caluire-et-Cuire, Lyon
 Ain: Thoissey, Jassans-Riottier,

Main tributaries of the Saône

R indicates a right tributary, L indicates a left tributary.

Navigation 

The Saône is navigable from its confluence with the Coney at Corre in the north of the département Haute-Saône all the way to its confluence with the Rhône (itself a navigable river) at La Mulatière, in Lyon. It has 5 locks. The 161 km long part upstream from Saint-Symphorien-sur-Saône to Corre, also named Petite Saône, is navigable for Freycinet gauge ships and has 19 locks.

The Saône is linked with the Loire by the Canal du Centre, with the Yonne by the Canal de Bourgogne, with the Marne by the Canal entre Champagne et Bourgogne (previously the Canal de la Marne à la Saône), with the Meuse by the Canal de l'Est, whose southern branch has been renamed the Canal des Vosges, and with the Rhine by the Canal du Rhône au Rhin. All the canals are Freycinet gauge.

Also navigable are the small Canal de Pont-de-Vaux (3 km), the Seille, navigable in a  stretch up to Louhans, and the lower part of the Doubs. None of these three connect the Saône to any other waterway.

Hydrology

The lesser Saône (Petite Saône) 

The lesser Saône has a tendency to flood (sometimes influenced by snow), with a very strong oceanic effect. The soils are not susceptible to much infiltration, so that they saturate quickly which contributes to surface runoff. The flow rate grows very quickly, and after receiving the waters of the Lanterne, the Saône already becomes a powerful river.

The mean annual flow rate, or discharge, of the Saône has been measured over 50 years (as of 2013) at the Ray-sur-Saône hydrological station, situated about  after the Lanterne confluence between Port-sur-Saône and Gray.

The runoff curve number in the upper basin of the lesser Saône is  annually, cf.  for the Lanterne, an elevated figure resulting from the very high rainfall in the Vosgian part of its watershed. The specific flow rate rises to 16.0 litres per second per square kilometre of watershed.

The greater Saône (Grande Saône) 

The greater Saône is formed by the confluence of the Doubs and the lesser Saône at Verdun-sur-le-Doubs.

The greater Saône has only modest tributaries which have little effect on floods or other hydrological properties. The slope is very gradual, and without hydraulic projects up to the north of Chalon aimed at guaranteeing a deep navigation channel, overflows would be more frequent.

Average flow rate 

Historic floods 
When the Saône floods, the impact varies considerably over the course of the river. A large flood with a strong flow rate upstream can be largely attenuated in the Bressan plain so as to have only moderate impact at Mâcon, particularly if it carries a limited volume of water. By contrast, a medium-sized flood of the lesser Saône can turn into a significant flood downstream, if the Doubs brings in a similar contribution at about the same time.

Historic floods include:
 The Lyon flood of 580
 The floods of 1602 during the autumn equinox and of 1711
 The flood of November 1840, with an estimated flow rate of almost , destroyed numerous habitations along the river valley. Many plaques marking this serious event are still visible in the villages affected.
 The flood of May 1856
 The largest floods in the last 50 years as of 2006: January 1955, March 1970, December 1981 and 1982, May 1983, March 2001 and 2006.

The reference flood in town planning is the 100-year flood. This reference was in the course of being modified as maps linked to modelling the 1840 flood in modern town planning conditions were distributed to local mayors in December 2008, and as new prevention plans were ordered for 2012.

See also 
 List of rivers in France
 The Rhône
 The Doubs
 Saône is also a French commune in the département of Doubs
 Chizerots

References

External links
 River Saône (Petite Saône) with maps and information on places, ports and moorings on the river from Corre to Saint-Jean-de-Losne, by the author of Inland Waterways of France, Imray
 River Saône (Grande Saône) with maps and information on places, ports and moorings on the river from Saint-Jean-de-Losne to Lyon, by the author of Inland Waterways of France, Imray
 Navigation details for 80 French rivers and canals (French waterways website section)
 Waterways in France
  Saone.org : French river cruising
 The Saône on OpenStreetMap
  Saone.org Navigation and information about the Saône
  Dictionary of French rivers and canals on the Babel project: The Saône
  Navigable routes in France on the website of Voies Navigables de France

 
Rivers of Ain
Rivers of Côte-d'Or
Rivers of Bourgogne-Franche-Comté
Rivers of Haute-Saône
Rivers of Grand Est
Rivers of Rhône (department)
Rivers of Auvergne-Rhône-Alpes
Rivers of Saône-et-Loire
Rivers of Vosges (department)